Vandhal Sridevi (English: Sridevi came in) is an Indian Tamil language drama starring M.Meenakshisundaram (Hero Mms) as Murugan  Sri Devi brother village roll nagamma son Ananya, Nandan Loganathan, Lasya Nagraj, Meera Krishna and Devi Priya. It is the remake of the Kannada language serial Lakshmi Baramma of Colors Kannada. The show replaced Enga Veetu Mapillai and aired on Colors Tamil from 18 April 2018 to 28 June 2019.

Plot 
Vanthal Sridevi is the story of a small town girl Sridevi. She is an illegitimate daughter and her family treats her as a slave. She escapes her cruel family through an inconvenient marriage to a man named Sidharth, a 30 year old bachelor who is the owner of a successful multinational company, and her struggles thereafter.

Cast

Main 
 M. Meenakshisundaram (Hero Mms) as Murugan Sri Devi brother Village roll Subhathra - Ananya as Sridevi / Lakshmi − Siddharth's wife
 Nandan Loganathan as Siddharth − Sridevi's husband; Shruthi's fiancé
 Lasya Nagraj / Suju Vasan as Shruthi a.k.a. Ammu − Siddharth's girlfriend

Supporting 
 Sirisha Sougandh / Meera Krishna as Janaki − Siddharth's widow mother
 Devi Priya as Saindhavi − Siddharth & Sruthi's aunty
 Sonia as Sambhavi − Shruthi's mother; Saindhavi's elder sister
 Ashok Pandian as Prakash − Sruthi's father
 Azhagappan as Ramu − Housekeeper
 Reshma Reshu as Bhairavi − Siddharth and Sruthi's aunty
 Reena as Akhila − Siddharth & Sruthi's grandmother
 Vetrivelan as Akash
 Manu as Anandraj
 Sam as Sidharth

Adaptations

References

External links 
 Colors Tamil Official Facebook in Tamil
 Colors Tamil Official Youtube Channel in Tamil
 Vandhal Sridevi on Voot

2018 Tamil-language television series debuts
Tamil-language television shows
Colors Tamil original programming
Tamil-language television series based on Kannada-language television series
2019 Tamil-language television series endings